The Unified Communist Party of Georgia (SEKP) is a political party in Georgia. It was founded in June 1994 through the merger of the Stalin Society, the Georgian Workers Communist Party and the Union of Communists of Georgia. The party is member of Union of Communist Parties — Communist Party of the Soviet Union.

The party was led by Panteleimon Giorgadze.  His son Igor Giorgadze was forced into exile after being accused of plotting to assassinate Eduard Shevardnadze.

The party publishes Komunisti.

References

1994 establishments in Georgia (country)
Communist parties in Georgia (country)
International Meeting of Communist and Workers Parties
Neo-Sovietism
Political parties established in 1994
Political parties in Georgia (country)